Madge Evans (born Margherita Evans; July 1, 1909 – April 26, 1981) was an American stage and film actress. She began her career as a child performer and model.

Biography

Child model and stage actress
Born in Manhattan, Madge Evans was featured in print ads as the "Fairy Soap girl" when she was two years old. She made her professional debut at the age of six months, posing as an artist's model. As a youth, her playmates included Robert Warwick, Holbrook Blinn, and Henry Hull. When she was four years old, Evans was featured in a series of child plays produced by William A. Brady. She worked at the old movie studio in Long Island, New York. Her success was immediate, so much so that her mother loaned her daughter's name to a hat company. Evans posed in a mother and child tableau with Anita Stewart, then 16, for an Anheuser-Busch Brewing Company calendar, and as the little mountain girl in Heidi of the Alps.

At the age of 8 in 1917, Evans appeared in the Broadway production of Peter Ibbetson with John Barrymore, Constance Collier and Laura Hope Crews. At 17, she returned to the stage and appeared as the ingenue in Daisy Mayme. Some of her better work in plays came in productions of Dread, The Marquis, and The Conquering Male. Her last appearance was in Philip Goes Forth produced by George Kelley. Evans' mother took her to England and Europe when she was 15.

Film career
As a child, Evans debuted in The Sign of the Cross (1914). She appeared in dozens of films, including with Marguerite Clark in The Seven Sisters (1915). She was featured with Robert Warwick in Alias Jimmy Valentine (1915). At 14, she was the star of J. Stuart Blackton's rural melodrama On the Banks of the Wabash (1923). She co-starred with Richard Barthelmess in Classmates (1924).

She was working on stage when she signed with Metro Goldwyn Mayer in 1927. As with theater, she continued to play ingenue parts, often as the fiancé of the leading man. She played the love interest to both Al Jolson and Frank Morgan in the 1933 film Hallelujah, I'm a Bum.

Working for MGM in the 1930s, she appeared in Dinner at Eight (1933), Broadway to Hollywood (1933), Hell Below (1933), and David Copperfield (1935). In 1933, she starred with James Cagney in the melodrama The Mayor of Hell. Other notable movies in which she appeared are Beauty for Sale (1933), Grand Canary (1934), What Every Woman Knows (1934), and Pennies From Heaven (1936).

In 1960, for Evans' contribution to the motion picture industry, she was honored with a star on the Hollywood Walk of Fame located at 1752 Vine Street.

Marriage
In York Village, Maine on July 25, 1939, she married playwright Sidney Kingsley, best known for his plays Dead End and Detective Story. The couple owned a  estate in Oakland, New Jersey. Following her marriage to Kingsley, Evans left Hollywood and moved to this home in New Jersey.

Radio and television
Later, she worked in radio and television in New York City. Evans performed on the Philco Television Playhouse (1949–1950), Studio One (1954), Matinee Theater (1955), and The Alcoa Hour (1956). She was also a panelist on the 1950s version of Masquerade Party.

Death 
Evans died at her home in Oakland, New Jersey from cancer in 1981, aged 71.

Filmography

Articles
Los Angeles Times, Marriages In Hollywood Exceed Divorces In 1939, January 2, 1940, Page A1.
Los Angeles Times, Child Film Star, Ingenue Madge Evans Dies at 71, April 27, 1981, Page A1.
Oakland, California Tribune, Two Wise Young Maidens, January 10, 1937, Page 80.
San Mateo Times, A Defence of Youth, January 18, 1936, Page 15.
Syracuse Herald, Madge Evans, Joan Marsh, and Jackie Coogan head Sextet Surviving, Sunday Morning, July 19, 1931, Section 3, Page 11.
Zanesville, Ohio Signal, Madge Evans Has Role With James Cagney, July 16, 1933, Page 12.

References

Further reading
 Dye, David. Child and Youth Actors: Filmography of Their Entire Careers, 1914-1985. Jefferson, NC: McFarland & Co., 1988, pp. 70-71.

External links

 

 Pictures at SilentLadies.com
 Photos at Virtual-History.com

1909 births
1981 deaths
American film actresses
American child actresses
American silent film actresses
American television actresses
Actresses from New York City
Deaths from cancer in New Jersey
Metro-Goldwyn-Mayer contract players
20th-century American actresses
People from Oakland, New Jersey